Coprosma linariifolia, commonly called mikimiki or yellow wood, is a shrub or small tree that is native to New Zealand. C. linariifolia is found in lowland to montane forest and scrub from the central North Island to the bottom of the South Island.

Coprosma linariifolia can grow up to 8 metres tall and has grey coloured bark. It has long elliptical leaves and the inner bark is yellow.

References

linariifolia
Flora of New Zealand
Taxa named by Joseph Dalton Hooker